Zalesie  is a village in the administrative district of Gmina Ostrów Wielkopolski within Ostrów Wielkopolski County, Greater Poland Voivodeship in west-central Poland.

The village has a population of 76.

References

Villages in Ostrów Wielkopolski County